Baffour Annor is a Ghanaian politician and a member of the Second Parliament of the Fourth Republic representing the Ahafo Ano North Constituency in the Ashanti Region of Ghana.

Early life 
Annor was born in Ahafo Ano in the Ashanti Region of Ghana.

Politics 
Annor was first elected into parliament on the ticket of the National Democratic Congress during the 1996 Ghanaian General Elections for the Ahafo Ano North Constituency in the Ashanti Region of Ghana. He polled 12,536 votes out of the 22,519 valid votes cast representing 45.70% over his opponents James Brown Ford Donkor of the New Patriotic Party who polled 9,628 votes representing 35.10% and Kwabena Nketia of the People's National Congress who polled 355 votes representing 1.30%. During the 2000 Ghanaian general election, he was defeated by Kwame Owusu Frimpong of the New Patriotic Party who polled 12,432 votes out of the 23,905 valid votes cast representing 52.00% over Baffour Annor of the National Democratic Congress who polled 10,784 votes representing 45.10%, Johnson O.Antoh of the People's National Congress who polled 515 votes representing 2.20% and Paul K. A. Mono of the Convention People's Party who polled 174 votes representing 0.70 votes.

References

Living people
National Democratic Congress (Ghana) politicians
Ghanaian MPs 1997–2001
People from Ashanti Region
Government ministers of Ghana
21st-century Ghanaian politicians
Year of birth missing (living people)